Daahoud is an album by Max Roach and Clifford Brown released on Mainstream Records in 1973 consisting of alternate takes of tracks recorded in 1954 for the albums Brown and Roach Incorporated and Clifford Brown & Max Roach.

Reception

Allmusic awarded the album 4½ stars stating "Anything with Clifford Brown belongs in a jazz (or American music) collection".

Track listing
All compositions by Clifford Brown except as indicated
"Daahoud" [alternate take] - 4:09
"I Don't Stand a Ghost of a Chance with You" [alternate take] (Bing Crosby, Ned Washington, Victor Young) - 2:59
"Joy Spring" [alternate take] - 6:34 
"I Get a Kick out of You" [alternate take] (Cole Porter) - 7:27
"These Foolish Things (Remind Me of You)" (Harry Link, Holt Marvell, Jack Strachey) - 3:45  
"Mildama" [alternate take] - 4:30

Personnel
Clifford Brown - trumpet
Max Roach - drums
Harold Land - tenor sax
George Morrow - bass
Richie Powell - piano

References

Max Roach albums
Clifford Brown albums
1973 albums
Mainstream Records albums